Beyond Space Without Limits  is the fifth full-length album by Beto Vázquez Infinity, released in December 2012.

Track listing

Credits 
The album features the six regular members of the Infinity live-band augmented with a number of, largely local, guests.

Beto Vazquez Infinity

Beto Vázquez: Bass / Lyrics / Lead, Rhythm and Acoustic Guitars / Keyboards / Orchestral Arrangements.
Jessica Lehto: Lead and Backing Vocals / Lyrics Arrangements.
Santiago Bürgi: Lead and Backing Vocals / Lyrics Arrangements.
Victor Rivarola: Acoustic Guitars, keyboards.
Omar Mansilla: Lead & Rhythm Guitars, Acoustic Guitars.
Norberto Román: Drums & Percussion.

Guests
Ana Maria Barajas	| (Nova Orbis)
Anja Orthodox 	| (Closterkeller)
Chiara Malvestiti	| (Crysalys)
Dario Schmunck	| (Darío Schmunck)
Gustavo Terzaghi 	| (Aleph Madness Project)
Iliour Griften Iliour Griften	| (Iliour Griften) www.heavendenies.com
Jose Luna	| (Eleventh Ocean)
Lucas Silva Sapia	| Violin
Luis Margarittini 	| Flauta Traversa - Flute
Magdalena Lee	| (Tears of Magdalena)
Mariana Berenstecher | Cello
Mariano Bacigaluppi | (Aleph Madness Project)
Markus Prompt	| (Markus Prompt)
Marysol Fernandez 	| Flauta Traversa - Flute
Matias Yanucci 	| Saxofón - Saxophone
Pablo Soler 	| (Pablo Soler)
Santi Toselli	| (Eleventh Ocean)

References

External links
 
 http://www.metalcry.com/newspost/beto-vazquez-infinity-beyond-space-without-limits/

2012 albums
Beto Vázquez Infinity albums